Hakea newbeyana is a shrub in the family Proteaceae and is endemic to an area in the southern Wheatbelt and Goldfields-Esperance  regions of Western Australia. It is a prickly shrub with smooth grey bark and sweetly scented cream-yellow flowers in profusion in spring.

Description
The branchlets are densely covered in flattened rusty-coloured, soft hairs. Flowering occurs from September to October. The large, grey, egg-shaped fruit are smooth with darker blister-like pitting on the surface and taper to a small blunt beak.

Taxonomy and naming
Hakea newbeyana   was first formally described by Robyn Mary Barker in 1990 and the description was published in the Journal of the Adelaide Botanic Gardens. The species was named in honour of Western Australian botanist Kenneth Newbey.

Distribution and habitat
This species grows in the central and eastern wheatbelt region of Western Australia in sandy loam and lateritic gravelly soils. Also in woodlands of the Hyden-Newdgate district.

Conservation Status
Hakea newbeyana is classified as "not threatened" by the Western Australian Government.

References

newbeyana
Eudicots of Western Australia
Plants described in 1990
Taxa named by Robyn Mary Barker